U.S. HealthWorks, Inc. was an American healthcare provider network with headquarters in Valencia, California. It offered occupational health care, including preventive care, pre-employment and post-offer exams and screening, return-to-work rehabilitative care, and urgent care clinics. The firm was a wholly owned, for-profit subsidiary of Dignity Health. In February 2018, it combined with Concentra in a transaction between Dignity Health and Select Medical.

History 
The firm was started in 1995. In 2001, it purchased the occupational medicine division on HealthSouth for a reported $30 million, adding 99 centers, more than doubling U.S. HealthWorks operations and making it one of the largest provider networks in the United States along with Concentra.

The firm moved its headquarters from Alpharetta, Georgia, to Valencia, California, in November 2007.

In February 2011, it acquired two medical centers in south Florida.  In July 2011 it acquired three NorthWorks Occupational Health Centers in the Minneapolis-St. Paul region. In October 2011, it acquired four Nashville-based medical centers and seven worksite locations operated by Tennessee Urgent Care Associates. In January 2013, it acquired the three Advanced Occupational Medicine Specialists (AOMS) healthcare centers in the Chicago region.

In June 2013, it began a partnership with Indiana University Health for collaboration in providing occupational health services, giving it the assets of eight free-standing IU Health clinics in the Indianapolis area. Also in June 2013, it acquired the assets of seven OHS-Compcare clinics and two worksites in the Kansas City area. In June 2014, it acquired the California Occupational Clinic in Los Angeles. In June 2014, it acquired five Atlanta-area centers from Choice Care Occupational Medicine and Orthopedics.

Dignity Health acquired U.S. HealthWorks in 2012, the financial terms were not disclosed. Since its acquisition by Dignity Health, the firm has acquired dozens of occupational health and urgent care centers across the U.S.

Regulatory action 
In 2003, U.S. HealthWorks agreed to pay $900,000 to the California Department of Insurance following a three-year investigation of 25 facilities in California. It was alleged that the firm did not always file a "Doctor's First Report of Injury" as required by California law, which would distort the risk experience used by insurance underwriters to calculate premiums. In the agreement, the firm did not admit liability.

References

External links 
 

1995 establishments in California
Health care companies based in California
Hospital networks in the United States